Alistair Mann is a freelance football commentator and TV sports presenter.

He was born in Salford and attended Manchester Grammar School. He trained as a journalist at the department of Journalism, Media and Communication, University of Central Lancashire.

Mann worked for ITV Granada, where he presented all their sports output including Soccer Night and the daily news magazine show Granada Reports.
He began his career with Manchester-based Piccadilly Radio.

In 2006, he began commentating on the BBC's Match of the Day. He formed part of the BBC's coverage of four Olympiads coverage: 2008 Beijing, 2012 London and 2016 Rio, including the men's gold medal match, won by Brazil against Germany on penalties. He also commentated for the BBC on the men's football tournament at the Tokyo Olympics in 2021.

Since 2013, he has been a commentator on the BT Sport channel covering UEFA Champions League, UEFA Europa League, French, German, Italian and MLS football. He's also on UEFA's coverage of international matches and has featured regularly on Sky Sports' coverage of those games.

Mann has won three National Royal Television Society awards and been nominated twice more. He is a winner of the BT Journalist of the Year award.

References 

People from Salford
British television presenters
Living people
Alumni of the University of Central Lancashire
1974 births
English association football commentators